The following is a list of massacres that have occurred in Brazil (numbers may be approximate):

References

Brazil
Massacres

Massacres
Massacres